The Red Hat Amphitheater (formerly the Raleigh Amphitheater) is an amphitheatre in Raleigh, North Carolina. It is adjacent to the Raleigh Convention Center.

The Raleigh Amphitheater books acts through an agreement with Live Nation, and is owned and operated by the City of Raleigh. The Amphitheater’s season currently runs from April through October. Capacity is 5,990: 1,800 fixed seats; 2,700 movable seats; and lawn space for 1,000.

The venue's name has changed several times during its construction and first few months of operation.  Plans to accept $300,000 from the local Budweiser distributor to name the venue the Bud Light Amphitheater fell through when the North Carolina Alcohol Control Board refused to grant an exception to rules which disallow naming rights for public facilities to be sold to alcohol manufacturers. On September 4, 2012 Red Hat struck a deal with the City of Raleigh for naming rights to the amphitheater.  The company paid the city $1.175 million for the deal.

See also
List of contemporary amphitheatres

References

External links
 
 Red Hat Amphitheater

Amphitheaters in North Carolina
Buildings and structures in Raleigh, North Carolina
Music venues in North Carolina
Tourist attractions in Raleigh, North Carolina